WCC Aviation, Inc., operating as Sky Pasada, is an airline based in Binalonan, Pangasinan, Philippines owned and operated by the Guico family. Founded in 2010, it primarily serves the northern Luzon provinces of Batanes, Cagayan and Isabela as well as the city of Baguio from its hub at Binalonan Airport.

History
SkyPasada started in 2005 as the WCC Pilot Academy (now WCC Aeronautical and Technical College), an aviation school established by World Citi Colleges, which was an educational institution in Cubao, Quezon City founded by the Guico family of Binalonan, Pangasinan. In 2008, the aviation school began operating from a private airstrip that the family built in Binalonan.

On 19 February 2010, the Guico family founded SkyPasada and began offering charter flights to various destinations in northern Luzon after it signed a memorandum of understanding with the local governments of Batanes, Cagayan and Isabela to launch the Northern Luzon Aeronautical Highway. The aeronautical highway is a project of Philippine President Gloria Macapagal Arroyo, who is a cousin of the company's founder. Its initial routes include flights from Tuguegarao to Maconacon, Isabela and Basco, Batanes, flights from Cauayan, Isabela to Maconancon and Palanan, Isabela, as well as a flight from Laoag to Batanes. In June 2010, the company began offering flights to Baguio via Loakan Airport and Boracay via Caticlan Airport.

On 1 July 2010, the airline temporarily suspended operations after the Civil Aviation Authority of the Philippines ordered the company to repair its fleet of two Let L-410 Turbolet aircraft to conform to international standards. It resumed operations on 29 May 2011.

Destinations 

As of January 2023, Sky Pasada flies to the following domestic destinations:

 Basco - Basco Airport
 Binalonan - Binalonan Airfield
 Calayan - Calayan Airport
 Cauayan - Cauayan Airport
 Maconacon - Maconacon Airport
 Palanan - Palanan Airport
 Tuguegarao - Tuguegarao Airport

Fleet 
As of March 2020, Sky Pasada's fleet includes the following aircraft:

Incidents 
 On 9 February 2012, Sky Pasada flight SP0633, a Let L-410 operating from Basco, Batanes to Itbayat, Batanes, overran the runway due to strong winds. As a result, the landing gear of the aircraft was destroyed.

References 

Airlines of the Philippines
Companies based in Quezon City
Airlines established in 2010
Philippine companies established in 2010